The Women's 100m races for class T46 amputee athletes at the 2004 Summer Paralympics were held in the Athens Olympic Stadium on 21 and 22 September. The event consisted of 2 heats and a final. It was won by Amy Winters, representing .

1st round

Heat 1
21 Sept. 2004, 12:30

Heat 2
21 Sept. 2004, 12:36

Final round

22 Sept. 2004, 17:00

References

W
2004 in women's athletics